Franz Bardon (1 December 1909 – 10 July 1958) was a Czech occultist and student and teacher of Hermetics.

Life and death
He was born in Troppau (Opava), Austrian Silesia. Bardon continued his work in the fields of Hermetics until 1958 when he was arrested and imprisoned in Brno, Czechoslovakia. Bardon died from pancreatitis on 10 July 1958 while in the custody of police.

Works 
Bardon is best known for his three volumes on Hermetic magic. These volumes are Initiation Into Hermetics, The Practice of Magical Evocation and The Key to the True Kabbalah.

An additional fourth work attributed to him by the title of Frabato the Magician, has been supposed by many of his students to be a disguised autobiography. Though the book lists its author as Bardon, it was actually written by his secretary, Otti Votavova. While some elements of the story are based on Bardon's real life experience, most of the book was written as an occult novel with much embellishment on the part of Votavova.

Bardon's works are most notable for their simplicity, their relatively small theoretical sections, and heavy emphasis on practice with many exercises. Students of his, such as Emil Stejnar, Walter Ogris, Martin Faulks, William Mistele and Rawn Clark consider him to have written the best training programs of any magician of the 20th century. They were written with the intention of allowing students who wished to practice magic the means to do so if they could not study under a teacher.

Initiation Into Hermetics 

Initiation into Hermetics provides step-by-step instruction in the form of practical exercises. These exercises are aimed at developing body, soul and spirit. The result of the practical exercises is the development of occult abilities which can be of benefit to the student, in as far as changing his existence for the better.

Bardon's training system is comprehensive. Initiation into Hermetics is divided into 10 practical steps. The program further subdivides each step into three areas – Non-being spirit or Mind (Spiritual abstract universal mental body; see Spiritual bodies: Theosophical society); Soul as mental body into the astral, psychic and emotional body; the astral body and physical body – with the intent of developing all areas of the self simultaneously and in a balanced way. This is to ensure that the student maintain a balance of the three "bodies", which accelerates progress in the long run and minimizes injury to oneself in the process of growth. Also, there occurs a purification of the personality, where the magician should become incapable of wishing harm to his fellow man. This is an important point since, as the power of the magician increases, so his ability to do harm – even unintentionally, increases. In summary—

Mental exercises of the Spirit (or abstract mental being) begin with simply observing the mind and progress from there, with each subsequent exercise building on the previous. 
Astral exercises of the Soul focus on systematically cataloging the positive and negative aspects of the self and, later, transforming and purifying the negative aspects into positives. 
Physical exercises of the body stress physical health and development as well as the integration and use of the physical body and physical environment.

It has also been found by experience that a hasty, random, intellectual or in-depth study of the theory and method can cause significant damage to the nervous system, the mental and psychic body and even lead to psychiatric disorders or other disorders if instructions are not followed. It is interesting even essential before starting the exercises to check one's psychological balance by a competent psychiatrist. The method of Dr. Vittoz (Dr. Roger Vittoz in Lausanne, Switzerland) is an interesting complement before starting the exercises. This is to pre-train or rebalance the perceptions of the five external senses.

The books are designed to be followed in a specific order for proper benefit. Tome 2 of Magical Evocation Practice must be attempted only after the total mastery of the first degrees of the first book Initiation into Hermetics, Tome 1. Only then is it preferable to understand and put into practice the rest without risk of negative karma with health consequences or worries during new incarnations. It is essential to completely dissolve the ego. (Note: this text does not quote its sources)

The Practice of Magical Evocation 
The Practice of Magical Evocation is Franz Bardon's second volume of The Holy Mysteries. In magical terms, the book is a practical guide to the proper evocation of and communication with divine entities existing in the atmospheric zones surrounding planets, stars, and moon as well as in the earth itself. It is a modern study of direct contact with the universal teachers – the other major works in the field are products of the Medieval, Renaissance, and Reformation periods. Beyond that it offers a glimpse into a complete magical universe. Bardon outlines a totally new and original hierarchy of magic, from the spirits of the four elements to those of the various planets, and even to each degree of the Zodiac. Included with the names and descriptions of the various entities are a collection of entirely unknown magical sigils, as well as an account of ancient Kabbalistic astrology.

Bardon's second work, dealing with the evocation of spirits, outlined first the symbolic meaning of the traditional ritual tools and temple designs, then goes on to describe a method of evoking spirits. In essence, the magician creates an environment hospitable to the entity in the temple or other medium of contact. They then enter an altered state of consciousness through natural meditation, to deep fullness of ecstasy without substances or trance, projecting their consciousness into the sphere of the entity in question, and call it back. Bardon emphasized two points about doing this sort of thing: first, that one must complete the necessary prerequisites of the training program or no success was possible; secondly, that the magician must call the spirit back under their "divine authority", not as a peer, otherwise they are liable to be manipulated by the entity.

The Key to the True Kabbalah 
In The Key to the True Kabbalah, Bardon demonstrates that mysticism of letters and numbers – the "true Kabbalah" – is a universal teaching of great antiquity and depth. Throughout the ages, adepts of every time and place have achieved the highest levels of magical attainment through the understanding of sound, color, number and vibration as embodied in the Kabbalah. This book, the third in Bardon's texts of Hermetic magic, is a practical guide to attainment.

The first two works, addressing the first two Tarots, are pre-requisite to understanding and making use of the third work. Bardon himself says that it is,
...quite up to the reader to study my books merely theoretically. In doing so, he will acquire a knowledge which he would not be able to get from any philosophical book. But knowledge is not yet wisdom. Knowledge depends on the development of the intellectual features of the spirit; wisdom, on the other side, necessitates the equable development of all four aspects of the spirit. Therefore knowledge is mere philosophy, which by itself alone can make a man neither a magician nor a Quabbalist. A learned man will be able to say a lot about magic, Quaballah, etc., but he will never be able to understand the powers and faculties rightly. With these few words I have explained to the reader the difference between the philosopher and the sage.
—Franz Bardon, The Key to The True Kaballah, 1975, pages 12-13

The idea is that the True Kabbalah is not a mantic art, as some perceptions of it (primarily relating to gematria) suggest, but a method of empowering the letters of the alphabet to create magical effects through their combination. Bardon links this to the Tantra of the East, but the basis of this comparison is not quite clear. Like his second book on evocation, the student must finish at least the first eight steps of IIH to get any valid results or have equivalent training in a different system and avoid damage to the psyche which "...can cause a splitting of the personality, schizophrenia, with all its serious consequences." (Bardon, 1975, Page 55). Bardon expands on this real possibility with the following advice...

...someone who wants to apply the methods on the use of genuine kabbalah at once, out of mere curiosity or inconsiderateness, exposes himself to various dangers. For in practice he would get into contact with various powers which he would not be able to control and thus he would be in danger of ruining his health. Therefore, anyone not sufficiently prepared for this step is herewith warned in time.
 —The Key to The True Kaballah, Franz Bardon, copyright 1975, page 62

This damage to the psyche "...clearly shows how inexcusable it is if writings of Oriental origin are interpreted incorrectly and translated literally in an intellectual language" as Bardon has "...put the greatest secret into the kabbalist's hands, as in the practical application of the fourfold key, the key of realization by the word. Thousands of years this secret has been guarded." (Bardon, 1975, page 55 and page 112)

The Golden Book of Wisdom 
This is only a fragment of a manuscript Bardon was working on but never completed. This book was supposed to have concerned the fourth leaf or Major Arcana of the Tarot (the Emperor). There remains no complete transcript of the works.

Frabato the Magician 
Frabato the Magician is a novelised biography of Bardon written by his secretary Otti Votavova, though attributed to Bardon himself because he probabely spoke about his preoccupations of life with her. The name of the protagonist, Frabato, was Bardon's stage name during his career as a performing magician. Set in Dresden, Germany, in the early 1930s, the story describes Frabato's magical battles with the members of a powerful and dangerous Black Lodge, his escape from Germany during the final days of the Weimar Republic, and the beginning of the spiritual mission which was to culminate in his writing a series of classic books on Hermetic magic. It also describes sinister occult forces which lay behind the rise of the Third Reich.

The essential and relevant part of the book is the revelation that Franz Bardon was the last reincarnation of the spirit embodied by Hermes Trismegistus, the esoteric creator of Hermeticism and the founder of Freemasonry, who, contrary to what Freemasons think, paid the karma that generated when he lived as Hermes Trismegistus, because the masonic idea of how the Laws of the Universe (the Law of God or Divine Justice) work, does not correspond to Bardon's ideas.

The moral basis of Freemasonry is that the balance of good and bad actions is achieved if the mason compensates for his bad actions with good actions or vice versa, but decides what actions he will take to find the desired equilibrium, where it is the transgressor of the Universal Law who decides both what he will do and to whom he will do it. Hence, as the good deeds of Hermes did not serve as penance or payment of his karma to obtain forgiveness, it is God who forgives and decides the penance or karma to pay and when to apply it, Hermes paid his karma as Bardon. In order to be in harmony with the Universe, the transgressor must follow the norms that God imposes. Respect God's laws and in case of sin repent, ask for forgiveness, and pay the penance or karma that God imposes in giving a choice when offering incarnation of the spirit in the next life.

In the edition published by Merkur, Wisdom of the Occident, Bardon's secretary Votavova wrote an annex, "In Memoriam" where she refers to the characters embodying Bardon's spirit as, among others: Hermes Trismegistos, Nostradamus, Lao Tse, Apollonius of Tyana, Robert Fludd, and Count Saint Germain. In his previous physical life he was a wise man (Mahatma) from the mountains named Mahum Ta-Tah, spelled like Ha-Khu-Ma-Na-Ta-Tah. Votavova also says that Bardon once told her that he embodied his own spiritual soul as a young boy between the ages of 14 to 21 and he was the one who decided to be the spiritual master of Victor Bardon, his own Father, who in his desire to become a divine initiate, asked -in his prayers- to know his true guru. The spirit of Bardon incarnated his only son, through an exchange of spirit (though unacceptable and impossible both from a spiritual and esoteric point of view). This commentary is presented to "explain" why Bardon's high spiritual level suffered his stay in a Nazi concentration Camp during World War II, as it was part of the karma of the child whose body he used.

What is clear in the light of this, is that both karma and the moment of payment is decided by God, who offers it to the spirit upon incarnation and it is this one who chooses from the options presented according to behavior in previous lives. Whatever the kind, the form or type of karma (family, places, acquaintances, etc.), the choice is made before the soul incarnates.

Additionally, in the Spanish Edition by Mirach, there are unproven claims published about Adolf Hitler, who is said to have belonged to Lodge 99 and to the Thule Order of Tibetan black magicians.

However, the online book, The Shadow of the Dalai Lama, has recently shown a distinct possibility of Hitler having indeed been connected to the identical practices of Mao Zedong, who was conclusively proven in that document to be a practitioner of the practices of the black magic text, the Kalachakra Tantra of Tibet. While Bo Yin Ra, a contemporary of Franz Bardon wrote about this text briefly, as being behind the anti-Caucasian occult forces behind not only Nazism but many organizations, Franz Bardon does not directly refer to it in his writings.

Ontology 
Bardon's Ontological system commences with Initiation Into Hermetics and is expanded on in the subsequent volumes. The highest reality is the Akasha, which is associated with both God and the platonic "world of ideas", and which gives rise to (and binds/balances) the four elements of earth, fire, air, and water. These four elements make up the sum of all forces and processes in each of the three worlds. Bardon also posited "electric" and "magnetic" forces, which are used more as terms for the universal active and passive forces, respectively. These are expressed in the positive and negative aspects of the four elements. Air and earth are both considered pseudo-elements as they arise only out of the interaction of fire and water.

The three worlds or "planes" are as follows: the mental plane is the highest reality, save for the undivided akasha, and is the true and eternal ego. Where the akasha is in a sense the world of ideas, it is the mental plane that sets these ideas in motion. The astral plane is the next one down and contains the archetypes of the physical world and to some extent the vital energy behind it; the physical world is the lowest of the planes and requires little explanation. Each of these worlds forms a matrix for the world below it. Since humans also have three bodies corresponding to their presence in each of the three worlds, severing the link between any two of these bodies will cause the dissolution of the lower forms (or death). Such things as astral projection are still possible as they only involve loosening the hold between the bodies.

Humans are considered to be special because they alone are "tetrapolar", or inherently containing all four elements, plus the fifth, the Akasha or Divine element. This concept is the basis of much of Bardon's training, which requires developing deficiencies and coming to a proper tetrapolar balance—only then could the initiate progress spiritually. Bardon repeatedly emphasizes that the initiate can only develop an understanding of himself and his universe within the scope of their awareness and spiritual maturity. Thus the more balanced, more evolved student has access to a more comprehensive reality. And because of that, more magical power as a side effect.

Notes

References

External links

 

1909 births
1958 deaths
Czech non-fiction writers
Deaths from pancreatic disease
Deaths from pancreatitis
Hermeticists
Occult writers
Writers from Opava
20th-century non-fiction writers